Von der Skyline zum Bordstein zurück ("From the Skyline Back to the Curb") is the fourth solo album by German rapper Bushido. The title alludes to his first solo album, Vom Bordstein bis zur Skyline (2003). It was released as both a standard and "platinum" edition.

Information 
The album contains no features and was entirely produced by Bushido himself, except for two tracks. It spawned three singles: "Von der Skyline zum Bordstein zurück", "Sonnenbank Flavour" and "Janine".

In an interview, Bushido said that it would be his last album, however, he went on to release a new one in 2007. The album received platinum status in Germany for more than 200,000 sold units and gold in Austria for more than 10,000 sold units.

Legal issues 
American band Nox Arcana accused Bushido of sampling three songs off them without permission. The songs appear on their albums Darklore Manor (2003) and Necronomicon (2004).

French band Dark Sanctuary also sued the rapper for sampling eight of their tracks without consent. On 23 March 2010, he was convicted by German courts to a condemnation and was obliged to stop the sales of the concerned albums, singles and samplers, including Von der Skyline zum Bordstein zurück. In addition to that, he was bound to recall and destroy all unsold copies.

Track listing 
Tracks 1–7 and 9–23 are produced by Bushido. Tracks 8 and 9 are produced by Kingsize.

Notes
The platinum edition contains two discs: The first features the actual track listing (without the limited edition) and the second disc features songs from the album Vom Bordstein bis zur Skyline (2003), censored and some songs missing as the original album was banned in Germany. Additionally, it features three remixes and the song "Es ist OK", from Nyze's album Geben & Nehmen (2007).

Samples 
A list of uncredit song samples are availed here.
"Intro"
 Excerpt from Layer Cake
"Universal Soldier"
"Charis" by Elend
"Weißt du?"
Beyond Midnight" by Nox Arcana
"Sonnenbank Flavour"
"Epitaph" by Antimatter
"Kurt Cobain"
"No Rest for the Wicked" by Nox Arcana
"Ich schlafe ein"
"L'Instant Funebre" by Dark Sanctuary
"Hast du was, bist du was"
"Les Larmes Du Meprise" by Dark Sanctuary
"Bloodsport"
"Reve Mortuaire" by Dark Sanctuary
"Sex in the City"
"L'autre Monde" by Dark Sanctuary
"Dealer vom Block"
"L'Arrogance" by Dark Sanctuary
"Berlin" by Bushido
"Bravo Cover"
"Valley of the Pain" by Dark Sanctuary
"Kickboxer"
Excerpt from Kickboxer
"Blaues Licht"
"Cthulhu Rising" by Nox Arcana
Excerpt from Rambo III
"Janine"
"Les Mémoires Blessées" by Dark Sanctuary
"Kein Fenster"
"Loin Des Mortels" by Dark Sanctuary
"Von der Skyline zum Bordstein zurück"
"Terminal" by Antimatter
"Wieder von der Skyline zum Bordstein zurück"
"The Champ" by The Mohawks
"Vie Ephémère" by Dark Sanctuary

Personnel 
Credits for Von der Skyline zum Bordstein zurück adapted from Discogs:

Artwork – Ben Baumgarten 
Mastered by – Dirk Niemeier 
Photography by – Kasskara 
Recorded by, mixed by – Kingsize

Year-end charts

References

2006 albums
Bushido (rapper) albums
German-language albums